Jeju Air Co., Ltd., is the first and largest South Korean low-cost airline. It is also a founding member of the Value Alliance.

History
Established as a joint venture by Aekyung Group and the Jeju Island government on January 25, 2005, Jeju Air became Korea's first low-cost airline. Jeju Air is named after the Jeju Island. 

In 2016, it helped found Value Alliance, the world's first pan-regional low-cost carrier (LCC) alliance, comprising eight Asia Pacific LCCs. In 2017, Jeju Air carried over 60 million passengers, with revenue reported of $890mm US operating profits over $80mm US. In 2018, Jeju Air carried 7.3 million international passengers along with 4.7 million domestic passengers. It domestic traffic has been relatively flat since 2016 as it has focused almost entirely on international expansion.

Jeju Air flight operations were affected by the coronavirus outbreak. In November 2020, there were approximately 3,100 employees at the airline. In August 2021, Jeju Air sold stock for raising $180 million for financing operations.

Destinations
Jeju Air offers scheduled domestic services, as well as international destinations including China, Japan, Russia, the Mariana Islands, and various Southeast Asian countries.

Codeshare agreements
Jeju Air codeshares with the following airlines.

 Jetstar

Fleet

Current fleet

, Jeju Air operates an all-Boeing 737 fleet composed of the following aircraft:

Retired fleet

Accidents and Incidents
 On August 12, 2007, Bombardier Dash 8 Q400 (registered HL5256) had performed a runway overshoot at Gimhae International Airport. All 74 passengers and 5 crews survived, but 6 passengers suffered minor injuries. Jeju Air Flight 502 is the first and the only incident of Jeju Air.

References

External links

Official website

Airlines of South Korea
South Korean companies established in 2005
Airlines established in 2005
Companies based in Jeju City
Low-cost carriers
South Korean brands
Value Alliance